Sam is a television drama series written by John Finch and produced by Granada Television between 1973 and 1975 for broadcast on ITV. Finch also created and wrote A Family at War for Granada.

The series is based on fact, with Sam as a boy growing up in Featherstone. It was initially set in the coalfields of Yorkshire in the inter-war period but eventually progressed to the modern (then) era. Interior scenes were recorded at Granada's studios in Manchester, while many of the exterior scenes were filmed in Lancashire. For example, the railway station used for filming was Garswood, near Wigan. Local dialect is used, e.g. top-at-knob referring to North Featherstone. The series was made in a video/film hybrid format, which was common at the time.

Episodes

Series 1: 1973

With Kevin Moreton as Sam aged 11 to 14.
It's 1934. Sam Wilson's mother Dora has been left by her husband and taken Sam to her hometown of Skellerton, a Yorkshire mining village.

Series 2: 1974

This series is set in the post war period; the main character is played by Mark McManus.
'Episodes'

 A New World  (Original Air Date—16 May 1974)
 Legacy  (Original Air Date—23 May 1974)
 Shape Yourself Round It  (Original Air Date—30 May 1974)
 Under a Cloud  (Original Air Date—6 June 1974)
 Head and Heart  (Original Air Date—13 June 1974)
 Stay Single and Live for Ever  (Original Air Date—20 June 1974)
 Credit  (Original Air Date—27 June 1974)
 Sins of the Fathers  (Original Air Date—4 July 1974)
 The World as It Is  (Original Air Date—11 July 1974)
 Land  (Original Air Date—18 July 1974)
 Half a Loaf  (Original Air Date—25 July 1974)
 Two Steps Forward, One Step Back  (Original Air Date—1 August 1974)
 Moving On  (Original Air Date—8 August 1974)

Series 3: 1975

'Episodes'

 God Sent Sunday  (Original Air Date—2 June 1975)
 In the Midst of Plenty  (Original Air Date—9 June 1975)
 Compensation  (Original Air Date—16 June 1975)
 Bonfire Night  (Original Air Date—23 June 1975)
 The Difference Between Us  (Original Air Date—30 June 1975)
 What You Care Is What You Do  (Original Air Date—7 July 1975)
 Gains and Losses  (Original Air Date—14 July 1975)
 The Honest Generation  (Original Air Date—21 July 1975)
 Opting Out  (Original Air Date—28 July 1975)
 Home Thoughts from Abroad  (Original Air Date—4 August 1975)
 The Next in Line  (Original Air Date—11 August 1975)
 Proposals  (Original Air Date—18 August 1975)
 Ends and Means  (Original Air Date—25 August 1975)

Video and DVD release
All three series were issued by Acorn Media UK in 2003.

See also
 When the Boat Comes In

External links
 

1970s British drama television series
1973 British television series debuts
1975 British television series endings
ITV television dramas
Television shows produced by Granada Television
English-language television shows